Columbia, Pennsylvania could refer to:
 Columbia, Lancaster County, Pennsylvania
 Columbia Historic District (Columbia, Pennsylvania)
 Columbia Borough School District
 Columbia County, Pennsylvania
Columbia Township, Bradford County, Pennsylvania